Ocean University may refer to

Dalian Ocean University 
Guangdong Ocean University
Indian Ocean University
Korea Maritime and Ocean University
National Taiwan Ocean University
Ocean University of China
Ocean University of Sri Lanka
Shanghai Ocean University
Zhejiang Ocean University